De Adriaan (English: The Adriaan) is a windmill located on the Windmolen 17 in Meerveldhoven, a neighbourhood of Veldhoven, North Brabant, Netherlands. Built in 1906 on an artificial hill, the windmill functioned as gristmill. The mill was built as a tower mill and its sails have a span of 26.20 meters. The mill is a national monument (nr 37040) since 1 October 1969.

History 
Built in 1906 De Adriaan was originally used as a gristmill. It was built in order of the family Van Grinsven from Beek en Donk. Since 1935 the mill is property of the family De Jongh. The mill was in regular use until the 1980s when the family De Jong took another windmill, Sint Jan, in use, located in Hoogeind in Veldhoven. The lower section of the mill are now used as a caferia. The mill is still in ready order.  In later days houses were built around the mill, decreasing its visibility.

Gallery of images 

Windmills in North Brabant
Rijksmonuments in North Brabant
Tower mills in the Netherlands
Grinding mills in the Netherlands
Windmills completed in 1906
Veldhoven
1906 establishments in the Netherlands
20th-century architecture in the Netherlands